Andrew Fournier (born November 5, 1987) is a Canadian former professional ice hockey player.

Fournier played 182 games in the ECHL where he registered 73 goals, 168 points, and 82 minutes in penalties.
 
Fournier led all North American import players in scoring in Sweden's First Division during the 2011–12 season, where he played for the Olofströms IK.  Teammate Eric Przepiorka finished 4th in scoring while Kramfors-Alliansen forward Bill Keenan and Karlskrona HK forward Bates Battaglia finished second and third respectively in scoring.

Career statistics

Regular season and playoffs

References

External links

1987 births
Living people
Canadian ice hockey forwards
Belfast Giants players
Brampton Beast players
Dayton Bombers players
Florida Everblades players
Kalamazoo Wings (ECHL) players
Norfolk Admirals players
Olofströms IK players
Plymouth Whalers players
Ice hockey people from Ontario
Canadian expatriate ice hockey players in Northern Ireland
Canadian expatriate ice hockey players in Sweden
Canadian expatriate ice hockey players in the United States